The 1976–77 Scottish Inter-District Championship was a rugby union competition for Scotland's district teams.

This season saw the 24th Scottish Inter-District Championship.

South won the competition with 3 wins.

1976-77 League Table

Results

Round 1

South: 

Glasgow District:

Round 2

North and Midlands:

 Edinburgh District:

References

1976–77 in Scottish rugby union
Scottish Inter-District Championship seasons